Definitive  may refer to:

 Definitive (TV series), an American music television series
 Definitive stamp, a postage stamp that is part of a regular issue of a country's stamps available for sale by the postal service

See also

 Definiteness (disambiguation)
 Definition (disambiguation)